Rafael "Rafa" Gómez Company (born 5 January 1974 in Moncada, Horta Nord, Valencia) is a Spanish retired footballer who played as a goalkeeper.

Career

Gómez began his career with local giants Valencia, playing for their B team, Valencia Mestalla, during the 1994–95 Segunda División B season. He was part of the first team squad that finished as La Liga runners-up the following year, but didn't play any matches. He left to join Racing de Ferrol ahead of the 1996–97 season, but stayed only six months before joining top flight side SD Compostela in the January transfer window. He spent a little over five years with Compostela, enduring relegation to the Segunda División in 1997–98, and again to the third tier in 2000–01.

Gómez played a key role in the first part of the following season, which ended with Compostela earning promotion directly back to the second division, but he left the club in March 2002 to join Levante. After a year and a half with Levante in the Segunda División, he dropped down a level with Lorca Deportiva in 2003. He played in every match bar one in his first season with Lorca, helping them to the runners-up spot in their Segunda División B group, although they failed to win promotion via the play-offs. After two matches of the 2004–05 season, which did end in promotion for Lorca, Gómez suffered an injury to his thumb, and was forced into retirement at the age of 30.

Honours
Valencia
La Liga runners-up: 1995–96

Lorca Deportiva
Segunda División B runners-up: 2003–04

Career statistics

1. Appearances in the 1995 Segunda División B play-offs
2. Appearances in the 1997–98 La Liga relegation play-off
3. Appearances in the 2004 Segunda División B play-offs

References

External links

1974 births
Living people
People from Horta Nord
Sportspeople from the Province of Valencia
Footballers from the Valencian Community
Spanish footballers
Association football goalkeepers
La Liga players
Segunda División players
Segunda División B players
Valencia CF Mestalla footballers
Valencia CF players
Racing de Ferrol footballers
SD Compostela footballers
Levante UD footballers
Lorca Deportiva CF footballers